Alabau is a surname. Notable people with the surname include:
Fatiha Alabau (born 1961), French mathematician
Magaly Alabau (born 1945), Cuban-American poet, theater director, and actor
Marina Alabau (born 1985), Spanish sailor